This is a bibliography of books by Isaac Asimov organized by series chronologically and by series timeline (i.e. prequels first).

See also Isaac Asimov bibliography (chronological), Isaac Asimov bibliography (alphabetical), and Isaac Asimov short stories bibliography.

Science fiction

Robot series

Also see Robot series List of books for short stories about robots by Asimov.

The Robot novels
 The Positronic Man (1992), a novel based on Asimov's short story "The Bicentennial Man", co-written by Robert Silverberg
The Caves of Steel (1954)
The Naked Sun (1957)
The Robots of Dawn (1983)
Robots and Empire (1985)

The Caliban trilogy (Not written by Asimov but in the same series)
Isaac Asimov's Caliban (1993) by Roger MacBride Allen
Isaac Asimov's Inferno (1994) by Roger MacBride Allen
Isaac Asimov's Utopia (1996) by Roger MacBride Allen

Galactic Empire series
 The Stars, Like Dust (1951)
 The Currents of Space (1952)
 Pebble in the Sky (1950), his first novel
 "Blind Alley" (1945), short story reprinted in The Early Asimov

Foundation series
Also see Foundation series List of books for short stories also in the Foundation universe by Asimov. 

Prequels
 Prelude to Foundation (1988)
 Forward the Foundation (1991)

Foundation Trilogy
 Foundation (1951)
 Foundation and Empire (1952)
 Second Foundation (1953)

Sequels
Foundation's Edge (1982)
Foundation and Earth (1986)

The Second Foundation Trilogy (not written by Asimov)
 Foundation's Fear (1997) by Gregory Benford
 Foundation and Chaos (1998) by Greg Bear
 Foundation's Triumph (1999) by David Brin

Lucky Starr series (using pseudonym Paul French)
 David Starr, Space Ranger (1952)
 Lucky Starr and the Pirates of the Asteroids (1954)
 Lucky Starr and the Oceans of Venus (1954)
 Lucky Starr and the Big Sun of Mercury (1956)
 Lucky Starr and the Moons of Jupiter (1957)
 Lucky Starr and the Rings of Saturn (1958)

 
Bibliographies by writer
Bibliographies of American writers
Science fiction bibliographies